A Glassy Junction;  literally means the junction of drinks (glassy). This is a Punjabi term referring to "pub" and is used in the Doaba region. Glassy Junction also sells tatte on their menu. it’s  a registered name in India, Europe and America. All such Pubs (Glassy Junctions) are owned by Punjabi people as the name has significance to the Punjabi people. The Punjabi touch of the name is due to word 'Glassy' which is a small strong 'Peg', noted in Punjabi songs of Balwinder Safri and A. S. Kang.

The pub in Southall was closed down prior to 2012 after being open since 1994. It was situated opposite the Sikh Gurdwara which was a bone of contention to the Sikh Community.

During its hey day, rumblings surfaced about sinister activities that took place at the pub, where exclusive services were offered to certain clientele. These claims were reported to authorities but no public investigation ever took place. 

The pub was well known, and had  visitors (predominantly male) from  all parts of the UK and indeed the world.

Other Meanings
The Punjabi men in particular are fond of drinking liquor and eating Namkeen. This is clear from 24000 Ahatas and liquor Vendors all over Punjab. The people make world style sitting arrangements for drinking wine and Desi(Home prepared wine). they want these arrangements be shared all over the world so they make Punjabi style sitting arrangements in many countries called Glassy Junctions.
Also Glassy junction is place that reverberates with young energy. The pub features music from rollicking rock to pleasant pop melodies.

In the World
There are many Glassy Junction franchises, the current most famous one is in Jallandhar. There are other notable ones in Southall and Surrey The board over Glassy Junctions shows a "peg" (a glass vessel filled with liquor).

Speciality
Glassy Junctions all over have Punjabi Interior and arrangements, which is their specialty. Another thing in common is their Punjabi Peg and Patiala peg which is specially produced and served. Some pubs serve Punjabi non-vegetarian food, with the U.K. Glassy Junction in JALANDHAR and Southall possessing restaurant provisions.

References

Restaurants in India